Chang-Du or Chang-Jing, sometimes called Nanchang after its principal dialect, is one of the Gan Chinese languages. It is named after Nanchang and Duchang County, and is spoken in those areas as well as in Xinjian, Anyi, Yongxiu, De'an, Xingzi, Hukou, and bordering regions in Jiangxi and in Pingjiang County, Hunan.

Phonology 
The Nanchang dialect has 19 syllable onsets or initials (including the zero initial), 65 finals and 7 tones.

Initials
In each cell below, the first line indicates IPA transcription, the second indicates pinyin.

Finals
The finals of the Nanchang dialect are:

Consonantal codas

 The codas in italic are at present only reserved in several Gan dialects.

Tone
Like other Chinese varieties, tones in Gan make phonemic distinctions. There are five phonemic tones in Gan, which are reduced to two 'entering tones' before stop consonants. In the traditional classification, these are considered separately:

Example
A poem of Meng Haoran (“Men Hau-len” in Gan):

References

 Běijīng Dàxué Zhōngguó yǔyán wénxuéxì yǔyánxué jiàoyánshì (1989). Hànyǔ fāngyīn zìhuì. Běijīng: Wénzì gǎigé chūbǎnshè. (北京大學中國語言文學系語言學教研室. 1989. 漢語方音字匯. 北京: 文字改革出版社)
 Norman, Jerry. [1988] (2002). Chinese. Cambridge, England: CUP 
 Yuán, Jiāhuá (1989). Hànyǔ fāngyán gàiyào (An introduction to Chinese dialects). Beijing, China: Wénzì gǎigé chūbǎnshè. (袁家驊. 1989. 漢語方言概要. 北京:文字改革出版社.)

External links
 Cantonese and other dialects (in Chinese)
 Classification of Gan Dialects from Glossika

Gan Chinese